Years of the Elephant (Dutch: Jaren van de olifant) is a Flemish graphic novel by Willy Linthout. Linthout was awarded the 2009 Bronzen Adhemar for this work.

Synopsis

Published in 2009, the graphic novel is divided in eight parts, and tells about the death of Linthout's son by suicide. 

The main character is Karel, Linthout's alter ego, who has lost his son Wannes due to suicide and struggles with the grief. He and his wife go through very different grieving processes. The work has remarkable visual metaphors, conveying the author's distress during his own grieving process.

The graphic novel was not colored, and Linthout chose not to ink the sketches. Asked about this in an interview with Het Nieuwsblad, Linthout replied that also his son's life was unfinished. He added that he didn't want someone else to finish this comic.

Awards

The graphic novel series earned Linthout the 2009 Bronzen Adhemar. The work was also nominated for the Eisner Awards for Best U.S. Edition of International Material and Best Writer/Artist-Nonfiction, the Prix Saint-Michel for best Dutch language comic, and the Stripschapprijs Album of the Year for part 1.

References

2009 graphic novels
Belgian graphic novels
Novels about suicide
Books about suicide
Autobiographical graphic novels